The Heart mansion (also called ) is one of the Twenty-eight mansions of the Chinese constellations.  It is one of the eastern mansions of the Azure Dragon. Its prominent figure is the star Alpha Scorpii.

Asterisms

References

Chinese constellations